American Dreamer is a 2018 American neo-noir thriller film directed by Derrick Borte and written by Derrick Borte and Daniel Forte. The film stars Jim Gaffigan, Robbie Jones, Isabel Arraiza, Tammy Blanchard, Alejandro Hernandez and Brian K. Landis. The film was released on September 20, 2019, by Saban Films.

Plot
Cam (Jim Gaffigan) is an employee for a vehicle for hire company who struggles to make ends meet. Particularly, Cam is having difficulty making child support payments, which could mean losing the ability to see his son. Cam gets the opportunity to chauffeur a low-level drug dealer named Mazz (Robbie Jones) for extra money. However, his increasing financial problems force him to make a rash and desperate decision: kidnap Mazz's infant child and demand a ransom. Cam quickly realizes that he is in way over his head, but there's no turning back.

Cast
Jim Gaffigan as Cam
Robbie Jones as Mazz
Isabel Arraiza as Marina
Tammy Blanchard as Becca
Alejandro Hernandez as Gumby
Brian K. Landis as Greg
Curtis Lyons as Andre
Eric D. Hill Jr. as Dontrell
Harrison Fall as Adam
Cynthia Tademy as Grandmother
Michael Hughes as Steve
Tommy Coleman as Officer Watson

Release
The film premiered at the LA Film Festival on September 27, 2018. The film was released on September 20, 2019, by Saban Films.

References

External links
 
 
 

2018 films
2010s English-language films
2018 thriller films
American thriller films
Hood films
2010s American films